This is a list of former radio transmitters across Canada that were used by the Canadian Broadcasting Corporation. Most of the former transmitters operated on the AM dial as low-power relay transmitters (LPRT's), which were added to vast remote communities on the AM dial, initially 20 watts of power when they first went on the air during World War II and were later boosted to 40 watts. Since the 1980s, most of the CBC AM LPRT's, including medium and high-power AM transmitters have either moved to the FM dial or shut down completely in which the trend continues today.

Note that only a few FM transmitters listed below had shut down as well due to various reasons.

CBC Radio One

Première Chaîne / Ici Radio-Canada PremièreLes services francophones de radio et de télévision hors Québec - Fédération des francophones hors Québec liste des réemetteurs de Radio-Canada (html version)

Note due to a vast number of CBC radio transmitters and rebroadcasters across Canada, there are a possibly a number of defunct transmitters that have yet to be listed here.

See also
List of CBC radio AM transmitters in Canada

References

External links
NRC radio log books 1982 - see pages 202 and 203.
Communication World Spring-Summer 1972 - Canada's Low-power Relay Transmitters - see page 47.
CBC station list - dxinfocentre.com

fr:CBC Radio